In the mathematical field of geometry, geometrography is the study of geometrical constructions. The concepts and methods of geometrography were first expounded by Émile Lemoine (1840–1912), a French civil engineer and a mathematician, in a  meeting  of the French Association for the Advancement of the Sciences held at Oran in 1888.
 Lemoine later expanded his ideas in another memoir read at the Pau meeting of the same Association held in 1892.

It is well known in elementary geometry that certain geometrical constructions are simpler than certain others. But in many case it turns out that the apparent simplicity of a construction does not consist in the practical execution of the construction, but in the brevity of the statement of what has to be done. Can then any objective criterion be laid down by which an estimate may be formed of the relative simplicity of several different constructions for attaining the same end? Lemoine developed the ideas of geometrography to answer this question. The question of the ubiquity of a construction is also raised. Whether or not a construction, regardless of simplicity, can be applied in all or most conditions, or just in the special cases, is an important consideration.

Basic ideas 
In developing the ideas of geometrography, Lemoine restricted himself to Euclidean constructions using rulers and compasses alone. According to the analysis of Lemoine, all such constructions can be executed, as a sequence of operations selected form a fixed set of five elementary operations. The five elementary operations identified by Lemoine are the following:

Elementary operations in a geometrical construction

In a geometrical construction the fact that an operation X is to be done n times is denoted by the expression nX. The operation of placing a ruler  in
coincidence with two points is indicated by 2R1. The operation of putting one point of the compasses on a determinate point and the other point of the compasses
on another determinate point is 2C1.

Every geometrical construction can be  represented by an expression of the following form

l1R1 + l2R2 + m1C1 + m2C2 + m3C3.

Here the coefficients l1, etc. denote the number of times any
particular operation is performed.

Coefficient of simplicity 
The number l1 + l2 + m1 +m2 + m3  is called the coefficient of simplicity, or the simplicity of the construction. It denotes the total number of operations.

Coefficient of exactitude 
The number l1 + m1 + m2 is
called the coefficient of exactitude, or the exactitude of the construction; it denotes the number of preparatory operations, on which the exactitude of the construction depends.

Examples 
Lemoine applied his scheme to analyze more than sixty problems in elementary geometry.
The construction of a triangle given the three vertices can be represented by the expression 4R1 + 3R2.
A certain construction of the regular heptadecagon involving the Carlyle circles can be represented by the expression 8R1 + 4R2 + 22C1 + 11C3 and has simplicity 45.

References

Further reading 

Euclidean plane geometry